University of Tripoli (UT) is a private, independent, university in Tripoli, Lebanon founded by Islah Islamic Association and popularly known as UT.

History 
It was founded in 1982, under the Tripoli University Institute for Islamic Studies, the first Islamic institution of higher education in Lebanon that would teach law in the field of university education.

Officially licensed by the Ministry of Education and Higher Education in Lebanon | Decree 1736 dated 14 April 2009.

Faculties
The university has three faculties:
 Faculty of Shariaa And Islamic Studies 
 Faculty of Business Administration 
 Faculty of Arts and Human sciences

Certification And Recognition 
The university is certificated and recognized in: Lebanon, Syria, Jordan, and Egypt.

The university is a member of: 
 Union of Arab Universities - Amman. 
 Association of Universities of the Islamic world (ISESCO) - Rabat.  
 Association of the Islamic Universities – Cairo.

References

External links
University of Tripoli Website

1982 establishments in Lebanon
Educational institutions established in 1982
Universities in Lebanon